Ranjit Kaur (also spelled as Ranjeet Kaur) (born October 1950) is a Punjabi singer of Indian Punjab. She is known for her duets with Muhammad Sadiq, a noted Punjabi singer and politician. She did many Punjabi films as a playback singer and some as a side-actress.

References 

1949 births
Living people
Punjabi-language singers
Indian film actresses
Indian women folk singers
Indian folk singers
Singers from Punjab, India
Women musicians from Punjab, India